Unipol Tower is a 33-story skyscraper located at Via Larga in Bologna, Italy. Construction was completed in 2012.

Designed by architectural firm OpenProject of Bologna, Unipol Tower incorporates various environmental innovations that achieved the prestigious (LEED) gold certification.

The building is the tallest construction in Bologna and currently the 12th tallest in Italy.

The main project includes a mall with a fitness centre, cinema, and luxury hotel, currently under construction.

References

See also 
List of tallest buildings in Bologna

Buildings and structures in Bologna